Beyt may refer to:

People
 Hassan Beyt Saeed (born 1990), Iranian football player player
 Mary Beyt (born 1959), American abstract painter

See also
 Beit
 Beit (surname)